Laughter, Tears and Goosebumps (abbreviated as LTG) is the debut studio album by Nigerian singer Fireboy DML. It was released by YBNL Nation on November 29, 2019. The album comprises 13 tracks and doesn't feature any guest artist. It was primarily produced by Pheelz, along with production from Cracker Mallo, Echo the Guru, IamBeatz and P.Prime. LTG was supported by the previously released singles "Jealous", "What If I Say" and "King". It received generally positive reviews from music critics, but was criticized for being labeled an "Afro-Life" record instead of an R&B album.

Background
LTG was initially scheduled for release on November 25, 2019, but ended up being released four days later. The album's music is a brand of R&B that combines love and social issues with empirical songwriting. LTG comprises 13 tracks and doesn't feature any guest artist; it amassed over 6 million streams on Spotify three days after its release. LTG was supported by the previously released singles "Jealous", "What If I Say" and "King". It was primarily produced by Pheelz, along with production from Cracker Mallo, Echo the Guru, IamBeatz and P.Prime.

Composition
On the  guitar-led album's opener "Need You", Fireboy DML pours his heart out to his lover and tries to make his romantic feelings known to her; the song borrows from Kola Ogunkoya's "Sweetie Baby" and is a cover of Ed Sheeran's "Tenerife Sea". In "Like I Do", Fireboy DML blends R&B with lightweight melodies and tungba percussion. In the Pheelz-produced track "Gbas Gbos", he infuses aspects of his personality with lyrics about realism; the song is composed of drums and guitar riffs. "Scatter" and its accompanying music video portrayed Fireboy DML as the "life of the party"; the song is composed of an electro-funk bass line. In the afro-house track "Omo Ologo", he draws influences from his indigenous background and is reminiscent of Zlatan and Naira Marley. The mid-tempo track "Energy" features drums and ominous chants. The pop-esque track "Vibration" merges EDM piano chords with guitar chords and a trumpet. "High on Life" contains an Afrobeat drum arrangement and is sonically similar to "Gbas Gbos".

Singles and other releases
The album's lead single "Jealous" first appeared on YBNL Nation's collaborative album YBNL Mafia Family (2018), before being re-released on March 25, 2019. The song is composed of guitar riffs, traditional drums and percussion; it combines African harmonies with elements of country and soul music. "Jealous" was produced by Cracker Mallo and is centered around love and the complicated feelings that go along with it. It was nominated for Song of the Year at The Headies 2019 and 2020 Soundcity MVP Awards Festival. The visuals for "Jealous" was directed by Director K.

The romantic track "What If I Say" was released on June 14, 2019, as the album's second single. It was produced by Pheelz, who incorporated a mix of percussion, ambient synth harmonies, and a drum riff into the production. The visuals for "What If I Say" was directed by TG Omori. The Echo the Guru-produced track "King" was released on August 1, 2019, as the album's third single. In it, Fireboy DML declares his worth to his love interest. The accompanying music video for "King" was directed by TG Omori; it contains images of Fireboy DML and his love interest in a rose petal embellished Rolls Royce, as well as images of him singing at a fashion show where models walk on a runway.

On November 28, 2019, Fireboy DML released the visuals for the EDM-fueled track "Scatter". The video features post-apocalyptic scenes of Fireboy DML waking up the dead with a device on his wrist and accompanying them to a dance party. It also pays tribute to DC Comics character the Joker. On January 13, 2020, Fireboy DML released the Clarence Peters-directed music video for "Need You", an acoustic guitar-driven ballad. The video depicts the artist and his love interest attempting to escape and subsequently getting caught by an individual trying to separate them.

On February 10, 2020, Fireboy DML released the visuals for "Vibration". In the TG Omori-directed video, Fireboy DML is seen in a ballroom filled with dancers doing the foxtrot and mambo, as well as with a group of outdoor ballet dancers.

Critical reception

LTG received positive reviews from music critics. Oluwatobi Ibironke of TooXclusive granted the album 9 stars our of 10, concluding its "happy party music is the laughter, the soulfulness of his [Fireboy DML's] love lines causes the goosebumps, while the troubles of his heart evokes the tears". Motolani Alake of Pulse Nigeria awarded the album 7.5 stars out of 10, calling it "formidable" and commending Fireboy DML for "justifying his talent and burgeoning reputation with an anthem for love season". Conversely, Alake criticized him for labeling his music as "Afro-Life" instead of R&B. Debola Abimbolu of Native magazine characterized LTG as a "pop project whose mission is to improve the mood of any listener" and commended Fireboy DML for finding the "sweet spot between partying and romance".  Emmanuel Esomnofu of NotJustOk praised Fireboy DML's voice and romantic tendencies, saying he's "confessional and exuberant – delivering overwhelming doses of emotion, as he promised with the title".

Track listing

Personnel
Credits adapted from the album's back cover.
  
Fireboy DML – primary artist, writing, mixing 
Olamide Adedeji – executive producer
Pheelz – production , mixing/mastering 
Cracker Mallo – production 
Echo the Guru – production 
P.Prime – production 
IamBeatz – production 
STG – mixing/mastering 
Redemption Beatz – mastering 
Godwyn – acoustic guitar 
Emmy – photography
Dayo Cyrus – graphics

Release history

References

2019 debut albums
Fireboy DML albums
YBNL Nation albums
Albums produced by Pheelz